Ernst Hannawald (born 20 October 1959 in Heidholzen, Germany) is a German television actor.

Movies
 1977 - Die Konsequenz (The Consequence)
 1978 -  (Die Faust in der Tasche)
 1979 - Traffic Jam (L'ingorgo - Una storia impossibile)
 1979 -  (Die letzten Jahre der Kindheit)

TV Movies
 1981: Zeit genug
 1986: Zur Freiheit
 1986: Irgendwie und Sowieso
 1997: Mali
 2002: Schlauer als die Polizei erlaubt
 Guest Star in Löwengrube, Café Meineid, München 7, Tatort, Derrick, The Old Fox, SOKO 5113 and Die Rosenheim-Cops

External links
Official Website from Ernst Hannawald

ZBF Agency Munich 

1959 births
Living people
German male television actors
German male film actors
20th-century German male actors
21st-century German male actors